Oliena (less correctly) is a commune in the province of Nuoro, Sardinia, Italy.

History
The territory of Oliena has been inhabited since the Palaeolithic Era until today.

The first proofs about the above-mentioned presences have been found inside the Grotta Corbeddu. The Nuragic civilization featured at least 54 villages, 30 nuraghes, sepulchres, buildings with a likely sacred destination were calculated.

Later it was held by the Republic of Pisa.

During the war between the Aragonese and the Giudicato of Arborea, the commune was occupied by Eleanor of Arborea's troops. The village, developed in medieval times, at the foot of a castle remembered in toponomy, remained to Arborea until its fall.

Oliena was passed to the Carrozs family, and later annexed to the marquisate of Quirra, as a feudal state of the Carrozs, and then of the Osorios family, who held it until 1839.

Geography

Territory
The territory of Oliena extends towards the north-eastern slope of the Supramonte, as far as the eastern foot of mount Ortobene, embracing the valley crossed by Cedrino river, which opens towards the plains of Galtellì and Orosei.

Flora and fauna
Species living in the most inaccessibles zones of the Mount Corrasi include:
 Aquilegia nugorensis
 Armeria morisii
 Campanula forsythii
 Cerastium supramontanum
 Erinus alpinus
 Limonium
 Nepeta foliosa
 Paeonia mascula
 Ribes sardoum Martelli
 Taxus baccata

Wildlife species living in the Oliena territory include:

 peregrine falcon
  royal eagle 
 moufflon 
 wild boar 
 buzzard 
 Sardinian hare 
 Sardinian fox  
 Sardinian deer 
 Speleomantes supramontis, a geo-newt,
 Griffon vulture

Main sights

Churches

Church of Santa Maria was built during the Pisan period. 
Former church of Sant'Ignazio
Santa Croce (Santa Rughe)
San Lussorio

Nuraghes
The Nuraghe Biriài is located, between two rocky spurs, in a position that makes it able to dominate the whole Cedrino valley. The passage, leading to a suspension door to the north, forms a trapezoidal span surmounted by a powerful architrave with a window lintel.

The Nuraghe Luduruju is located on the border of the Gollei Ospène Plateau. It follows the single-tower typology, with one room, built with slab-shaped blocks of local basalt.

The Nuraghe Otha'he stands on a rocky outcrop. It was surrounded along its perimeter by a wall curtain. In spite of the limestone (a rock hard to work upon), it was used.

In the interior of the Nuraghe Susùne, a tholos room opens to the internal passage. According to the transept scheme, it provided another trapezoidal light oriented to the west.

Other nuraghes include Nuraghe Suvegliu.

Sepulchres

The Megalithic sepulchre of Catteddu Crìspu is formed by two hangings; one external with megalithic blocks, and the other internal with the small hewn rocks. The interior is encumbered by a large slab with three hollows carved on its ends.

The Domos de Gurpìa are examples of Domus de Janas excavated in a granite erratic block.

Other 'Domus de Janas include:
Domos de Suvangiu
 Domos de Jumpàdu 
 Domos de Frathale

Nuragic village of Tiscali
Tiscali is situated in the large grotto that shelters the village. Discovered at the end of the 17th century, it is commonly considered to be a Nuragic site. The inhabited centre of huts, built with small stones joined by mud, was for inhabited also in the Roman and Medieval ages.

Nuragic village of Sedda 'e sos Carros

This village is located in the Lanaitho Valley.

Economy

Agriculture and typical products
The position of the territory is favourable, thanks to its healthiness and the presence of spring-waters still today, permitting to practise a rich variety of cultures on the plains (olive-groves, orchards, vineyards, kitchen gardens). Pastures are prevalently destined to sheep and cattle-breeding.

The typical products are:
 Sardinian "Pecorino" cheese (sheep's milk cheese),
 cheese cream, Sa Vrughe (a kind of cheese),
 sausages
 ham
 bacon, (tomatoes and salty kind of cheese)

The pasta:
 
  (gnocchi)
 

The sweets:
 
 
 
 
 
 
 
 
 
 

The bread:

Nepente wine
The Nepente of Oliena is a vintage wine,  obtained from a selection of grapes Cannonau cultivated in the municipality of Oliena.

The wine is red-brown and becomes amaranth when aged.

People

 Giovanni Corbeddu Salis (1844–1898), famous bandit considered as "The Robin Hood of Sardinia".
 Gianfranco Zola, former Chelsea FC and Cagliari player, and former West Ham United manager.

References

Sources
 Dolores Turchi, Sardegna mediterranea, 1999
 Gianfranca Salis, Ambiente e Archeologia, 1999
Francesco Murgia, Lanaitho valley, Sa Ohe,  Su Gologone - 1999'
 Luisa Lecca, Sebastiano Carai, Oliena. Storia, cultura, ambiente, tradizione'', 2009

External links

Cities and towns in Sardinia